Jon Rangfred Hanssen (born 19 June 1956) is a Norwegian former professional racing cyclist. He won the Norwegian National Road Race Championship in 1980.

References

External links

1956 births
Living people
Norwegian male cyclists
Place of birth missing (living people)